Rtyně nad Bílinou is a municipality and village in Teplice District in the Ústí nad Labem Region of the Czech Republic. It has about 800 inhabitants. It lies on the Bílina river.

Administrative parts
Villages of Kozlíky, Malhostice, Sezemice, Velvěty and Vrahožily are administrative parts of Rtyně nad Bílinou.

References

Villages in Teplice District